Częstochowa is a parliamentary constituency in the Silesian Voivodeship. It elects 7 members of the Sejm.

The district has the number '29' for the election to the Sejm and covers the city county of Częstochowa, and Częstochowa, Kłobuck, Lubliniec and Myszków counties.

Results 2001-2019

Members of Sejm (2019-2023)

Electoral districts of Poland